Marsheilla Gischa Islami (born 25 March 1997) is an Indonesian badminton player affiliated with Djarum badminton club.

Career

2023 
In January, Gischa and her partner Akbar Bintang Cahyono competed at the home tournament, Indonesia Masters, but had to lose in the qualifying round from junior Chinese pair Jiang Zhenbang and Wei Yaxin. In the next tournament, they lost in the quarter-finals of the Thailand Masters from Japanese pair Hiroki Midorikawa and Natsu Saito.

Achievements

BWF World Tour (1 title, 1 runner-up) 
The BWF World Tour, which was announced on 19 March 2017 and implemented in 2018, is a series of elite badminton tournaments, sanctioned by Badminton World Federation (BWF). The BWF World Tour is divided into six levels, namely World Tour Finals, Super 1000, Super 750, Super 500, Super 300 (part of the HSBC World Tour), and the BWF Tour Super 100.

Mixed doubles

BWF International Challenge/Series (5 titles, 1 runner-up) 
Mixed doubles

  BWF International Challenge tournament
  BWF International Series tournament

BWF Junior International 
Girls' doubles

Mixed doubles

  BWF Junior International Grand Prix tournament
  BWF Junior International Challenge tournament
  BWF Junior International Series tournament
  BWF Junior Future Series tournament

Performance timeline

Indonesian team 
 Junior level

 Senior level

Individual competitions

Junior level 
Girls' doubles

Mixed doubles

Senior level

Women's doubles

Mixed doubles

References

External links 
 

1997 births
Living people
People from Blitar
Sportspeople from East Java
Indonesian female badminton players
21st-century Indonesian women
20th-century Indonesian women